Carmen Wegge (born 24 September 1989) is a German politician of the Social Democratic Party (SPD) who has been serving as a member of the Bundestag since 2021.

Early life and education 
Wegge was born 1989 in the West German town of Hattingen and studied law at the University of Munich. During her studies, she lived in Barbados for three months.

Political career 
Wegge entered the SPD in 2005 and became member of the Bundestag in 2021, representing the Starnberg – Landsberg am Lech district.
 
In parliament, Wegge has since been serving on the Committee on Internal Affairs and the Committee on Legal Affairs. In this capacity, she is her parliamentary group's rapporteur on the legalization of cannabis, gun control, explosives, cybercrime, surveillance instruments and powers, data protection, freedom of information, assisted suicide, gender equality, violence against women, and gender representation on corporate boards, among others. She also serves on the parliamentary body in charge of appointing judges to the Highest Courts of Justice, namely the Federal Court of Justice (BGH), the Federal Administrative Court (BVerwG), the Federal Fiscal Court (BFH), the Federal Labour Court (BAG), and the Federal Social Court (BSG).

Within her parliamentary group, Wegge belongs to the Parliamentary Left, a left-wing movement.

Other activities 
 Foundation for Data Protection, Member of the advisory board (since 2022)
 German United Services Trade Union (ver.di), Member

Personal life 
Wegge is married and has a child.

References 

Living people
People from Hattingen
1989 births
Social Democratic Party of Germany politicians
21st-century German politicians
Members of the Bundestag 2021–2025